, also known as Saving My Stupid Youth, is a Japanese television drama written by Kankuro Kudo. The series was broadcast by TBS from 12 October to 21 December 2014.

Plot
Heisuke Hara (Ryo Nishikido) teaches at his alma mater, an all-boys Buddhist high school, while being tormented with guilt by an act of misdemeanor from his high school days. Events unfold as the school plans to merge with an all-girls Catholic high school due to dwindling enrolment, and Heisuke's homeroom class was chosen to be merged with a class headed by Risa Hachiya (Hikari Mitsushima) as an experiment.

Cast

Ryo Nishikido as Heisuke Hara
Hikari Mitsushima as Risa Hachiya
Kento Nagayama as Satoshi Tsutaya
Haru as Yuko Hachiya
Daiki Shigeoka as Yuzuru Ebisawa
Reina Triendl as Yamada Birkenstock Kyoko
Rina Kawaei as Ai Jinbo
Katsuhisa Namase as Daizaburo Sannomiya
Maki Sakai as Mai Awashima
Yuki Saito as Yoshie Yoshii
Kazuki Enari as Ippei Hara

References

External links
  
 

Japanese drama television series
TBS Television (Japan) dramas
2014 Japanese television series debuts
2014 Japanese television series endings
Television shows written by Kankurō Kudō
Television series about Buddhism